Susanne Wetteskog (born 13 July 1958) is a Swedish former diver. She competed at the 1976 Summer Olympics and the 1980 Summer Olympics.

References

External links
 

1958 births
Living people
Swedish female divers
Olympic divers of Sweden
Divers at the 1976 Summer Olympics
Divers at the 1980 Summer Olympics
Divers from Gothenburg
20th-century Swedish women
21st-century Swedish women